Operation Zitronella (Operation Lemon Flavour), also known as  (Operation Sicily), was an eight-hour German raid on Spitzbergen, in the Svalbard Archipelago, on 8 September 1943. Six Norwegians were killed and 31 were taken prisoner; sixteen Germans were wounded, one dying of his wounds.

Background

Svalbard

The Svalbard Archipelago is in the Arctic Ocean,  from the North Pole and a similar distance to Norway to the south. The islands are mountainous, with permanently snow-covered peaks, some glaciated; there are occasional river terraces at the bottom of steep valleys and some coastal plains. In winter, the islands are covered in snow and the bays ice over. The Gulf Stream warms the waters and the sea is ice-free during the summer. In the 1940s, there were settlements at Longyearbyen (Longyear Town) and Barentsburg, in inlets along the south shore of Isfjorden, in Kings Bay (Quade Hock) further north along the coast and in Van Mijenfjorden to the south.

The settlements attracted colonists from many places; the treaty of 1920 neutralised the islands and recognised the mineral and fishing rights of the participating countries. Before 1939, the population consisted of about  mostly Norwegian and Soviet workers in the mining industry. Drift mines were linked to the shore by overhead cable tracks or rails and coal dumped over the winter was collected by ship after the summer thaw. By 1939 production was about  a year, split between Norway and the USSR.

Second World War

During the Second World War, the Svalbard Archipelago was the scene of several military operations. In August 1941, British, Canadian and Free Norwegian Forces landed on Spitzbergen during Operation Gauntlet to destroy the coal industry, associated equipment and stores. No attempt was made to establish a garrison and the civilian population was evacuated. Nazi Germany set up manned meteorological stations in the Arctic to improve weather forecasts, vital for the warfare against Allied convoys from the UK to the USSR. Dr Erich Etienne, a former Polar explorer, commanded an operation to install a manned station on the islands. Advent Bay (Adventfjorden) was chosen for its broad valley, a safer approach and landing ground for aircraft. The subsoil of alluvial gravel was acceptable for an airstrip and the south-eastern orientation of the high ground did not impede wireless communication with Banak in Norway; the settlement of Longyearbyen was close by. The site received the code-name  (from Banak and Spitzbergen Öya) and ferry flights of men, equipment and supplies began on 25 September.

The British followed events from Bletchley Park through Ultra and four British minesweepers were diverted to investigate and reached Isfjorden on 19 October. A   5 aircraft crew spotted the ships and the thirty men at Adventfjorden quickly were flown to safety by the aircraft and two Junkers Ju 52 transport aircraft. Adventfjorden was deserted when the British arrived but some code books were recovered; the Germans returned once the ships had departed. Dr Albrecht Moll and three men arrived to spend the winter of 1941–1942 transmitting weather reports. In April 1942, Operation Fritham the landing of a Norwegian force at Barentsburg to occupy the islands. The operation met with disaster but by the summer of 1943, the later Allied Operation Gearbox and Operation Gearbox II secured control of the islands.

Prelude

The  decided to evacuate the  weather station during the summer of 1942, since the ice-free season made it vulnerable to Allied attack. The submarine  (K Siegfried Strelow) was ordered to recover the six men. On 23 August 1942, Strelow took aboard the party at Ebeltofthamna in Krossfjorden on the Mitra peninsula, without Allied interference and arrived at Narvik on 31 August. The posts of Flag Officer Northern Waters at Narvik was merged with Group North, which brought the commander of the German ships at Alte Fjord under the command of  Otto Schniewind at Kiel. Dönitz persuaded Hitler not to scrap the surface fleet and made plans to demonstrate the value of the ships and raise the morale of the crews.

German plans

By  on 7 September, the force was half way to Bear Island. During the evening a message was received that a British reconnaissance aircraft had flown over Alte Fjord at  when the ships were only  from Svalbard, with the British fifty hours away, even at full speed.

Action

At  on 8 September,  and the 5th and 6th Destroyer Flotillas landed troops in Advent bay, while  and the 4th flotilla sailed to Barentsburg,  flying a white ensign as a ruse. Just before the ships opened fire, a wireless message from Grønfjord was intercepted by the ships that three cruisers and seven destroyers had arrived;  began to jam the frequency but could not tell if the message was blocked. At  a reply from Reykjavik suggested that the message had been received and  silenced the transmitter with shells from its main armament. The Norwegian guns were put out of action and coal heaps, supplies of food, water and electricity generators were destroyed. Z29 and Z33 were both damaged, with Z33 having to be taken in tow. A broadside of twelve shells silenced the Bofors guns.  fired its main guns at a coal mine at Heerodden and set it on fire. A message from Z29 led  to sail further into Grønfjord, fire another twenty shells and at  Johannesson reported that the troops had landed as planned.

The surviving Norwegians fled into the hinterland, using a blazing coal dump for cover as the landing party seized the installations at Barentsburg. Recovering the last of the floatplanes caused a delay to  until  and then the German ships left at  The Norwegians repaired their wireless and got off a sighting report, which led to the Home Fleet sailing from Scapa Flow but too late to intercept the German ships, which reached port on 9 September.

Aftermath

Analysis

 was a qualified success; it brought no lasting benefit, since the Allies quickly re-occupied Spitzbergen island. On 19 October, the cruiser  arrived at Barentsburg with relief and reinforcements for the Norwegian garrison. Morison judged the effort disproportionate to the results, suggesting that the same ends could have been achieved more simply. In 2013, Niklas Zetterling and Michael Tamelander called the operation insignificant, apart from useful training for the crews.

Casualties
Sixteen German sailors were wounded, one dying of his wounds and six Norwegians were killed. Captain Morten Bredsdorff and 30 prisoners were sent to Oflag XXI-C in Schildberg in the annexed , joining  officers interned there.

Subsequent operations

Under cover of the attack, the  installed a weather station on Hopen Island. (Isolated for months after the Nazi German surrender in May 1945, the airmen on Hopen Island gave themselves up in September 1945 to the captain of a Norwegian fishing boat.) A Catalina flying boat of 190 Squadron, based at Sullom Voe in Scotland, was ordered to reconnoitre Isfjorden and took off at  The crew was to fly to Svalbard, then south to a point off the Norwegian coast, turning east to make landfall at Murmansk. If the German ships were sighted, the Catalina crew were to shadow the ships until shot down or the prudent limit of endurance (PLE) was reached, then fly to Grasnaya on the Kola Inlet. The Catalina was filled with fuel and left behind its depth charges, flew to Sorkapp, then navigated up the west coast to Isfjorden and searched for signs of life around Cape Linhe, Barenstburg, Green Harbour, Grumantby and Longyearbyen, taking photographs and finding only destroyed buildings and smoke from the fires started by the Germans. (The aviators heard later that a survivor in the hills heard them and ran to the shore but was not seen.) The Catalina was flown towards Norway along the expected track of the German ships, assuming that they were making for Alta Fjord. Some oil was seen on the sea and a Ju 88 was spotted high up flying the other way but no ships. The Catalina landed as planned and the crew were told the flight was in support of Operation Source, an X-Craft (midget submarine) attack against the ships; their reconnaissance photos were to be flown to Britain for briefing material.

See also
 Arctic Ocean operations of World War II

References

Bibliography

Further reading

External links 
 Operation Zitronella
 Operation 'Silizien' (Zitronella)

1943 in Norway
Arctic naval operations of World War II
Battles of World War II involving Germany
Naval battles of World War II involving Germany
Zitronella
Battles and operations of World War II involving Norway
History of Svalbard
Military in the Arctic
Z
September 1943 events